Henry Söderholm (17 April 1938 Turku – 15 July 2015 Helsinki) was a Finnish diplomat. He was Ambassador to Baghdad 1987–1990, Bern 1992-1996 and in Luxembourg 1998-2001

References

Ambassadors of Finland to Iraq
Ambassadors of Finland to Switzerland
Ambassadors of Finland to Luxembourg
People from Turku
1938 births
2015 deaths